Kurt Teigl (born 8 August 1961) is an Austrian bobsledder. He competed in the four man event at the 1988 Winter Olympics.

References

External links
 

1961 births
Living people
Austrian male bobsledders
Olympic bobsledders of Austria
Bobsledders at the 1988 Winter Olympics
People from Neunkirchen District, Austria
Sportspeople from Lower Austria